St. Xavier's School is a private Catholic secondary school located in Bokaro Steel City, Jharkhand, India. The Christian minority school was founded by the Jesuits in 1966 primarily to serve the children of those working at Bokaro Steel Plant. It is the oldest private school in Bokaro and the only ICSE school in the main township of Bokaro. It is one of the top schools of the city.

Overview 
The plant felt the necessity of a school in Bokaro Steel City where the children of their employees could be taught up to the higher secondary or its equivalent stage through the medium of English, and so invited Xaviers Hazaribagh Association to undertake the opening and running of such a school. The school opened on 18 July 1966.

The house system is followed and Loyola, Carmel, Loreto, and Xavier houses compete against each other each December. Co-curricular activities include: Integrity Club (promotes integrity in society), Peace Club (promotes peace and harmony), Spectrum Club (promotes spoken English), Science Club, Interact Club (provides service opportunities), Sports Club (develops game skills), Eco Club (sponsors ecological activities), Finomics Club (enhances student knowledge of economics and finance), I.T. Club (deals with modern tech and cyber crimes), Xavier Online (creative writing quarterly), Social Service League (encourages outreach).

The school undertakes various charitable activities through its Social Service League. It prepares students for the Indian Certificate of Secondary Education (ICSE), and Indian School Certificate (ISC) exams. It has served as the venue for regional speech contests.

Xavier's celebrated its Golden Jubilee in December, 2016 wherein it sought participation and contribution from its students who are present round the globe. There is a strong bond amongst its alumni in form of BOXA (Bokaro Old Xaverian Associations).

Principals
The following individuals have served as principal of the school:

Notable alumni 
 Arundhati Bhattacharya, retired Indian banker and former Chairman of the State Bank of India
Shishir Parkhie - A widely acclaimed Indian Ghazal Singer, Composer & Live Performer.
Kaveri Priyam - Kaveri Priyam is an Indian actress who primarily works in Hindi television. She is best known for her portrayals of Kuhu Maheshwari Rajvansh in Yeh Rishtey Hain Pyaar Ke

See also

 List of Jesuit schools
 List of schools in Jharkhand
 Violence against Christians in India

References

External links
 

Jesuit secondary schools in India
Jesuit primary schools in India
High schools and secondary schools in Jharkhand
Educational institutions established in 1966
1966 establishments in Bihar
Private schools in Jharkhand
Bokaro district